Richard Lynn Stenhouse Jr. (born October 2, 1987) is an American professional stock car racing driver. He competes full-time in the NASCAR Cup Series, driving the No. 47 Chevrolet Camaro ZL1 for JTG Daugherty Racing. Stenhouse was the 2010 Nationwide Series Rookie of the Year, and won back-to-back Nationwide Series championships in 2011 and 2012. Stenhouse was the 2013 Sprint Cup Series Rookie of the Year.
He won the 2023 Daytona 500.

Racing career

Early career
Stenhouse began kart racing at the age of six, and acquired 47 wins and 90 podium finishes by the time he moved into sprint car racing in 2003.

Beginning his sprint car racing career in 360 cubic inches winged sprint cars, he won the National Sprint Car Hall of Fame Driver Poll and Dirt Winged Sprint Car Rookie of the Year in 2003. He began racing in the USAC sprint car series in 2004, and in 2006 won National Sprint Car Hall of Fame Driver Poll Wild Card in both the 360 and 410 winged sprint car divisions. Stenhouse won dual Rookie of the Year honors in the United States Auto Club sprint car (finished 6th in the standings) and midget (finished 3rd in the standings) series in 2007.

In 2008, he began his major-league stock car racing career in the ARCA Racing Series, driving for Roush Fenway Racing. On May 10, 2008, in only his sixth race in a stock car, Stenhouse won his first ARCA RE/MAX Series event at the Drive Smart! Buckle Up Kentucky 150 at Kentucky Speedway in Sparta, Kentucky. He had two wins in 21 races and finished fourth in the season ranking as a rookie.

NASCAR

2009–2012

In 2009, Stenhouse began competing in a partial schedule in the Nationwide Series at events that conflicted with the Sprint Cup schedule. He had his first Top 10 finish at Kentucky Speedway when he finished ninth. At the following race in Milwaukee, he led 46 laps in the later stages of the race and finished fifth.

The 2010 season started horribly for Stenhouse, but he showed signs of life as the year went on. After crashing out of four out of the first ten races of the season (and crashing in practice also), Stenhouse was replaced by Brian Ickler for three races and Billy Johnson drove at Watkins Glen. After taking on veteran Mike Kelley as crew chief, Stenhouse immediately responded with a third-place finish at Daytona. He proceeded to take seven top tens and was locked in a tight battle for Rookie of the Year (ROTY) with Brian Scott. With Scott struggling after his release from Turner Motorsports, Stenhouse took the ROTY award after a fourth-place finish at Homestead.

On May 22, 2011, Stenhouse held off charges from Carl Edwards and Brad Keselowski for the final 18 laps to claim his first win in the John Deere Dealers 250 at Iowa Speedway, his 51st start in the Nationwide Series.

Stenhouse made his Sprint Cup Series debut at the 2011 Coca-Cola 600 substituting for fellow Roush teammate Trevor Bayne. Stenhouse finished 11th in the Wood Brothers Racing entry.

Stenhouse had dominated the Kroger 200 Nationwide Series race at Lucas Oil Raceway before being passed by Brad Keselowski late in the race. Stenhouse took his second Nationwide win at Iowa in August, again holding off teammate Carl Edwards, but more bizarrely as Stenhouse's engine blew coming off of turn 4. Edwards subsequently rear-ended his teammate, pushing him across the line to the win.

At the end of the 2011 season, having scored 16 Top 5 finishes, Stenhouse won the Nationwide Series championship by 45 points over Elliott Sadler.

Stenhouse drove the No. 6 Sprint Cup Series car for Roush Fenway Racing in the 2012 Daytona 500, finishing 20th.

In the Nationwide Series the previous day, Stenhouse had been caught up in a 10-car wreck on the final lap of the series' season-opening event; a week later he finished 3rd at Phoenix, while a week after that Stenhouse won his first race of 2012 at Las Vegas, winning the Sam's Town 300, holding off Mark Martin to take the checkered flag; he would win races at Texas Motor Speedway and Iowa Speedway before suffering a run of bad luck starting at Charlotte Motor Speedway. Stenhouse would score 3 more victories at Atlanta, Charlotte, and Kansas. He once again held off Sadler to take his second consecutive Nationwide Series championship.

2013–2019: Roush Fenway Racing
On June 26, 2012, Roush Fenway Racing announced that Stenhouse would drive the No. 17 car in the Sprint Cup Series full-time for 2013, replacing Matt Kenseth. Trevor Bayne replaced Stenhouse in the Nationwide No. 6 car for 2013.

To prepare for the 2013 season, Stenhouse ran in the AAA 400 at Dover International Speedway where he finished 12th, the Bank of America 500 at Charlotte Motor Speedway where he finished 35th because of engine problems, but he was running near the front of the field. He also ran in the season finale Ford 400 at Homestead-Miami Speedway in which bad luck struck again as he cut a tire and smacked the wall, similar to what happened to Marcos Ambrose two races before, in Texas. In all of these races he ran in the No. 6 car of Roush Fenway Racing sponsored by Cargill, Best Buy, and Fifth Third Bank respectively.

In 2013, Stenhouse competed full-time in the No. 17 Ford Fusion in the Sprint Cup Series. He was paired with rookie crew chief Scott Graves, who was formerly an engineer for Roush Fenway Racing. Stenhouse placed 12th in his second Daytona 500 (his first with the No. 17 team) despite suffering crash damage on lap 134. Stenhouse led his first lap of Sprint Cup competition at Las Vegas Motor Speedway. Later in the season, Stenhouse had his breakout race at Kansas, where he qualified third and led 26 laps, before finishing 11th. In qualifying at Atlanta Motor Speedway, Stenhouse won the pole position with a 29.227 lap time. Stenhouse recorded his first Top 10 finish with a 10th-place finish at Richmond, followed by an eighth-place finish at Chicagoland. His best finish of the season was a third-place finish at Talladega behind Jamie McMurray and Dale Earnhardt Jr. Stenhouse was eventually named Cup Series Rookie of the Year.

In 2014, both Stenhouse and Roush-Fenway suffered through a dismal season. Stenhouse's best finish was a second-place showing at Bristol in the spring, a race won by teammate Carl Edwards, one of the few impressive showings by Roush in 2014. Stenhouse failed to qualify at Talladega in October and finished 27th in points.

After a slow start in 2015, Stenhouse nearly won the Food City 500 where he came home in fourth. After a weak summer, he had a consistent run of 15th or better in six of the last 10 races, including two top 10s at Dover and Talladega. After poor performances at Martinsville and Phoenix where he was as high as 22nd in the points standings, he fell to 25th at the season's ending.

Stenhouse got off to a better start in 2016 than 2015 including a Top 10 run in Atlanta. He got his next Top 10 at Fontana, in 2015 It took 29 races to get two Top 10s in the year, it took five in 2016. On March 1, his team announced that Sunny D would be his sponsor in select Cup and Xfinity Series races. On August 21, 2016, Stenhouse recorded a then-career-best second-place finish in the Bass Pro Shops NRA Night Race at Bristol Motor Speedway.

After a gamble to stay out, Stenhouse restarted 2nd with two to go at Phoenix on the Green White Checkered. He stacked up the line and caused Ryan Newman to cruise away to the finish. After a flat tire early on at Richmond he rebounded to finish fourth. At Talladega's 2017 GEICO 500, Stenhouse won his second career Cup Series pole and his first since the 2013 Cup Series season. It was also RFR's first pole of the 2017 season. Stenhouse led the opening laps and then stayed mid-pack for the rest of the race. After Stenhouse avoided an 18-car pileup he found himself in second place chasing Kyle Busch. After the final restart, Stenhouse passed Busch on the final lap for the win. It was his first Cup Series win, while RFR snapped its 101-race winless drought, dating back to Carl Edwards' victory in the 2014 Toyota/Save Mart 350 at Sonoma Raceway. Stenhouse later picked up his second victory of the year at Daytona in July, passing David Ragan with two to go, further solidifying his spot in the 2017 Playoffs.  In the Playoffs, at Chicago he had a rough showing with a not so strong car and commitment line penalty which he ended up in 25th. In the next race at New Hampshire he hit the wall on Lap 3 but recovered to finish 15th on the lead lap to tie Austin Dillon on points for the last spot.  At Dover in the elimination race, he struggled early starting in 14th, falling back to 23rd and off the lead lap but took a risk of staying on the lead lap and got a caution while in third place and finished fourth in Stage 1 getting seven Stage Points.  He would not earn any Stage Points in Stage 2 but finished 19th while Ryan Newman finished 13th which proved enough for Stenhouse Jr. as he finished above Newman by two points for the last playoff spot in the Round of 12 and advanced to the second round of the playoffs. Stenhouse was eliminated in the second round after failing to perform well enough in the races.

2018 started with decent results for Stenhouse, as he had consistent runs throughout the season. However at Daytona, Stenhouse was mainly to blame for two accidents, and he was caught up in three crashes, ultimately finishing 17th, after winning the first two stages, and receiving a security escort after the race. He dropped to 18th in the final point standings as he failed to visit victory lane, missed the playoffs, and recorded only five Top 10 finishes.

On August 1, 2019, Stenhouse announced he signed a contract extension with Roush Fenway Racing through 2021. However, on September 25, Roush Fenway Racing announced that Stenhouse will be replaced by Chris Buescher in 2020, with Roush using an option in their contract with Buescher. In the aftermath of the sudden dismissal from the team, which was criticized by some members of the racing community (Including Kevin Harvick), Roush president Steve Newmark, said that, after ten years with the team, the relationship with Stenhouse had "run its course."

2020–present: JTG Daugherty Racing

On October 16, 2019, JTG Daugherty Racing announced Stenhouse would drive for them in 2020. On December 2, 2019, JTG Daugherty Racing announced that Stenhouse would be driving the 47 car, moving Ryan Preece to the 37.

On February 9, 2020, Stenhouse got off to a fast start by winning the pole for the Daytona 500.

Stenhouse Jr. narrowly lost the 2020 GEICO 500 to Ryan Blaney, spinning Aric Almirola about a hundred yards from the finish line, and nearly winning but coming up .007 short. Stenhouse scored three top fives and four top tens throughout the season, and all top fives came in the first half of the regular season.

Stenhouse started the 2023 season by winning the 2023 Daytona 500, his third career victory. This win likely puts him in the playoffs for the first time since 2017.

Sprint car and midget racing
Outside of NASCAR, Stenhouse is a car owner and part-time competitor in sprint car and midget racing. In 2012, he formed Stenhouse Jr. Racing and fielded the No. 41 car for Jason Johnson in the American Sprint Car Series (ASCS). In 2017, he partnered with Matt Wood to form Stenhouse Jr.-Wood Racing and fielded the No. 17 car for driver Joey Saldana in the World of Outlaws sprint car series.

After his first NASCAR Cup Series win at Talladega in May 2017, Stenhouse became one of only eight drivers to have won in the NASCAR Cup Series as well as in the USAC Silver Crown, National Sprint Car, and National Midget series, joining Mario Andretti, A. J. Foyt, Jeff Gordon, Kyle Larson, Ryan Newman, Ken Schrader, and Tony Stewart.

Personal life
Stenhouse was born in Memphis, Tennessee, and was raised in Olive Branch, Mississippi. He is the first Mississippian driver to attempt a full-time schedule since Lake Speed in 1997. He started on dirt then made a transition to stock cars in 2008.

Stenhouse is an Ole Miss Rebels football fan. In 2014, he led the Rebels onto the field before the annual Egg Bowl game versus in-state rival Mississippi State.

Stenhouse is a devout Baptist.

Stenhouse is a fan of classic country music.

Stenhouse was in a relationship with Danica Patrick from November 2012 to December 2017. In November 2021, Stenhouse announced his engagement to Madyson Goodfleisch, originally of Ashville, Ohio. They got married on October 26, 2022 in Charleston, South Carolina.

In media
In 2016, Stenhouse competed on the show American Ninja Warrior which first aired on June 13; he did not make it past the second obstacle.

In June 2017, Stenhouse was a pit reporter for the Fox NASCAR broadcast of the Xfinity Series race at Pocono Raceway. A Cup drivers-only coverage, he worked alongside Erik Jones and Ryan Blaney.

Motorsports career results

Stock car career summary 

† As Stenhouse Jr. was a guest driver, he was ineligible for championship points.

NASCAR
(key) (Bold – Pole position awarded by qualifying time. Italics – Pole position earned by points standings or practice time. * – Most laps led.)

Cup Series

Daytona 500

Xfinity Series

K&N Pro Series West

 Season still in progress
 Ineligible for series points

ARCA Re/Max Series
(key) (Bold – Pole position awarded by qualifying time. Italics – Pole position earned by points standings or practice time. * – Most laps led.)

References

External links

 
 Official profile at JTG Daugherty Racing
 
 RoushFenway.com article on first ARCA win 

Living people
1987 births
People from Olive Branch, Mississippi
Racing drivers from Mississippi
NASCAR drivers
NASCAR Xfinity Series champions
ARCA Menards Series drivers
Rolex Sports Car Series drivers
American Ninja Warrior contestants
RFK Racing drivers
USAC Silver Crown Series drivers
Baptists from Mississippi